Osmia atriventris, sometimes referred to as the Maine blueberry bee, is a megachilid bee native to eastern North America from Nova Scotia to Alberta in the north, and Iowa to Georgia in the south. This solitary bee normally gathers pollen from many different flowers, but will pollinate blueberries, and is sometimes used commercially for this purpose.

References 

atriventris
Insects of the United States
Fauna of the Eastern United States
Hymenoptera of North America
Insects described in 1864
Taxa named by Ezra Townsend Cresson